Elaeodina is a genus of moths belonging to the subfamily Tortricinae of the family Tortricidae. It contains only one species, Elaeodina refrangens, which is found on Borneo.

See also
List of Tortricidae genera

References

 , 2005: World Catalogue of Insects vol. 5 Tortricidae.
 , 1926, The Sarawak Museum Journal 3: 149.

External links
Tortricid.net

Tortricini
Monotypic moth genera
Tortricidae genera